Semisulcospira morii is a species of freshwater snail with an operculum and is an aquatic gastropod mollusk in the family Semisulcospiridae.

Distribution 

This species is endemic to lake Biwa, Japan. It appears only around Chikubu Island and Takeshima island.

Ecology
Semisulcospira morii lives in habitats with rocky and gravel bottoms.

References

External links

Semisulcospiridae